Arthur Gaskin (born 16 January 1985) is a professional squash player who represented Ireland. He reached a career-high world ranking of World No. 80 in June 2009. Arthur married Carey Harte in 2016.

Arthur regularly wrote about his experiences on the blog of SportsShoes.com.

References

External links 
 
 
 

1982 births
Living people
Irish male squash players